Vashan (Russian and Tajik: Вашан) is a village in Sughd Region, northern Tajikistan. It is part of the jamoat Urmetan in the Ayni District.

References

Populated places in Sughd Region